
Zhukovsky (masculine), Zhukovskaya (feminine), or Zhukovskoye (neuter) may refer to:

People
Zhukovsky (surname) (or Zhukovskaya)
Żukowski

Places
Zhukovsky District, several districts in Russia
Zhukovsky Urban Okrug, a municipal division which Zhukovsky City Under Oblast Jurisdiction in Moscow Oblast, Russia is incorporated as
Zhukovsky Urban Administrative Okrug, an administrative division which the town of Zhukovka and seven rural localities in Zhukovsky District of Bryansk Oblast, Russia are incorporated as
Zhukovskoye Urban Settlement, a municipal formation which Zhukovsky Urban Administrative Okrug in Zhukovsky District of Bryansk Oblast, Russia is incorporated as
Zhukovsky (inhabited locality) (Zhukovskaya, Zhukovskoye), several inhabited localities in Russia

Other
Zhukovsky International Airport in Zhukovsky, Moscow Oblast, Russia
Zhukovsky air base, an airfield used by the Gromov Flight Research Institute in Moscow Oblast, Russia
Zhukovsky (film), a 1950 film by Vsevolod Pudovkin

See also
Zhukov (disambiguation)
Zhukovka, several inhabited localities in Russia
Zhukovo, several rural localities in Russia

hy:Նիկոլայ Ժուկովսկի